Robert Townley Parker (1793–1879) was a Unionist Member of Parliament for the United Kingdom House of Commons constituency of Preston.

He was the son of Thomas Townley Parker, Esq. of the cadet brand of the Towneley family of Towneley Hall. He inherited Cuerden Hall, near Preston, Lancashire on his father's death.

He presented a petition related to the Maynooth Grant affair to prevent Roman Catholic Members of Parliament from Voting on Church matters, complaining about duties on English goods in France and Belgium.

Townley Parker was elected Guild Mayor of Preston in 1861–2.

He was also a prominent Freemason. Whereas most Freemasons Lodges are named after areas or moral virtues, Townley Parker had the unusual honour of having not one but two Masonic Lodges named for him; namely Townley Parker Lodge 1032, which currently meets at Cunliffe Hall in Chorley  and Townley Parker Lodge 1083, which meets in Manchester.

References

Article features content from Who's Who of British Members of Parliament - Volume I 1832-1885: A Biographical Dictionary of the House of Commons,

External links
 

1793 births
1879 deaths
Conservative Party (UK) MPs for English constituencies
Mayors of Preston, Lancashire
UK MPs 1837–1841
UK MPs 1852–1857
Members of the Parliament of the United Kingdom for constituencies in Lancashire
Hulme Trust